Estadi Ciutat de València is a football stadium in Valencia and is the home ground of Levante UD. Built in 1969 and holding up to 26,354 spectators, it is the 23rd-largest stadium in Spain and the 4th-largest in the Valencian Community.

On 8 September 2014, the ground hosted Spain's first match of UEFA Euro 2016 qualification, a 5–1 victory over North Macedonia.

References

External links

Estadios de Espana 

Levante UD
Football venues in Valencia
Sports venues completed in 1969